"Kiss Land" is a song by Canadian singer the Weeknd, from his debut studio album of the same name. It was released on May 17, 2013, by XO and Republic Records, as the lead single from the album. Upon its release, it received critical acclaim from music critics, who appreciated the progression from his earlier works. On June 25, 2013, a month later the music video was released, featuring adult actresses London Keyes, Asphyxia Noir and Bonnie Rotten. It is considered NSFW due to the sexually explicit content, but a censored version was released as well.

Background and composition
In 2011, the Weeknd released the mixtapes House of Balloons, Thursday, and Echoes of Silence to critical acclaim. The following year, he released the compilation album Trilogy, which contained his earlier projects with three newly recorded tracks. The Weeknd began work on his debut studio album Kiss Land in 2013; he revealed the title and cover artwork on March 17.

The song was produced by Silkky Johnson, known for his previous work with ASAP Mob and Lil B, in which the first half of the song is a repurpose of another song he initially produced for Main Attrakionz entitled "Nothin' Gonna Change," from the 2011 mixtape 808s & Dark Grapes II. "Kiss Land" was released to the iTunes Store on May 17, 2013, and lasts for seven minutes and thirty-six seconds, it contains a sample of "La Ritournelle" by French musician Sébastien Tellier. The song was co-produced by DannyBoyStyles, the Weeknd himself and Jason "DaHeala" Quenneville. It is divided into two musical portions; the first section discusses themes of sex, while the latter half addresses the topics of alcoholism.

Critical reception
Upon its release, "Kiss Land" was met with widespread acclaim from music critics. Lauren Nostro from Complex complimented the Weeknd's growth as an artist, noting that he "continually refines" his "defined aesthetic", and noted that the track "boasts a bridge". Global Grind's Brittany Lewis described the song as "hypnotic", while Carl Williott of Idolator thought that the use of a woman's scream brought a "sinister lothario thing to absurd new heights". Rob Markman from MTV News felt that "Kiss Land" shared a similar structure to the Weeknd's previous tracks, but also suggested that the forthcoming release of Kiss Land will reveal "a lot more about music's mystery man".

VH1 India gave "Kiss Land" a 7/10 citing it as "An impressive sequential plunge into the Weeknd's cryptic tide, but as he himself so coyly reminds us,"This is nothing to relate to," and we may have already extended our invitation".

Charts

References

External links
 

2013 songs
2013 singles
The Weeknd songs
Songs written by the Weeknd
Songs written by DaHeala
Song recordings produced by the Weeknd
Republic Records singles
XO (record label) singles
Songs about kissing